Frank André Pollmächer (born 22 March 1983 in Riesa) is a German long-distance runner who specializes in the 5,000 and 10,000 metres.

Biography
Pollmächer finished seventh in the 10,000 metres final at the 2006 European Athletics Championships in Gothenburg. His personal best time is 27:55.66 minutes, achieved in June 2007 in Dommelhof. He was 18th in the men's marathon at the 2009 World Championships in Athletics.

He returned to the track after a four-year break and claimed the bronze medal at the European Cup 10,000m in Oslo.

Pollmächer competes for LAC Erdgas Chemnitz and trains under Bernd Dießner. He is the older brother of Anja Pollmächer.

References

External links
 
 
 

1983 births
Living people
German male long-distance runners
German male marathon runners
People from Riesa
Sportspeople from Saxony
20th-century German people
21st-century German people